Goodwin is an unincorporated community in Dakota County, Nebraska, United States.

History
Goodwin was established in 1892. It was named for John C. Goodwin, a railroad official. A post office was established at Goodwin in 1892, and remained in operation until it was discontinued in 1940.

References

Unincorporated communities in Dakota County, Nebraska
Unincorporated communities in Nebraska